Nevin Galmarini (born 4 December 1986) is a Swiss snowboarder and Olympic Champion. In February 2018, Nevin Galmarini won a gold medal at the Winter Olympics in Pyeongchang, South Korea in the Parallel giant slalom. In 2009, he won the Swiss nationalships and became the Swiss champion in parallel giant slalom. He competed in the parallel giant slalom for Switzerland during the 2010 Winter Olympic games in Vancouver, British Columbia, Canada and in the 2014 Winter Olympic games in Sochi, Russia where he won the silver medal. He currently resides in Ardez, Switzerland.

2009/2010 Season highlights
Top ten classification in the World Cup list
Swiss national champion in alpine Snowboarding
Selection for the FIS Snowboarding World Championships
Bronze medalist in PGS at the Nor-Am Cup in Copper Mountain (Colorado)
Competing PGS in the 2010 Winter Olympics

Career highlights
Fourth in PGS at the 2010 World Cup, in Sudelfeld, Germany
Seventh in PGS at the 2009 World Cup, in Kreischberg, Germany.
Silver and Bronze medalist at the 2009 Europa Cup, in Nova Levante-Carezza, Italy
Bronze medalist at the 2009 Nor-Am Cup 2009 in Copper Mountain (Colorado)
Gold medalist at the 2018 Winter Olympics in Pyeongchang, South Korea

External links

Results from the official FIS Website

Swiss male snowboarders
Olympic snowboarders of Switzerland
Snowboarders at the 2010 Winter Olympics
Snowboarders at the 2014 Winter Olympics
Snowboarders at the 2018 Winter Olympics
Snowboarders at the 2022 Winter Olympics
1986 births
Living people
Medalists at the 2014 Winter Olympics
Medalists at the 2018 Winter Olympics
Olympic gold medalists for Switzerland
Olympic silver medalists for Switzerland
Olympic medalists in snowboarding
Universiade medalists in snowboarding
Sportspeople from St. Gallen (city)
Universiade bronze medalists for Switzerland
Competitors at the 2011 Winter Universiade
21st-century Swiss people